Belle Haven is the name of some places in the U.S. state of Virginia:
Belle Haven, Accomack County, Virginia
Belle Haven, Fairfax County, Virginia